Ali Karim (Persian: علی کریم, born 10 October 1977) is an Iranian film director and screenwriter.

He was born in Tehran, Iran. Producer, actor, scriptwriter and director Ali Karim was born in Tehran on 10 October 1977. He was a theatre actor before appearing in films, notably in features such as Killing Mad Dogs /2001 (Bahram Beyzaï) and The Passenger Of Rey / 2001 (Davoud Mirbagheri). He then served as assistant director on various films, working especially with Dariush Mehrjui on Mum's Guest (Mehman-e Maman).

In 2008, he took part in Abbas Kiarostami's directors’ workshop during which time he made his first short, Yellow, Blue, Red. He then worked as Kiarostami's assistant on Shirin before completing a second short, "The Lift". His two shorts have been successful in numerous international film festivals. On the back of his success Ali Karim finally directed his first feature, Pothole in 2009. The film closed the Critics’ Week at the Venice Film Festival the very same year.

Filmography

Footnotes

1977 births
Iranian film directors
Iranian screenwriters
Living people